Henry France (1947 – 10 May 2005) was a Ghanaian footballer. He competed in the men's tournament at the 1972 Summer Olympics.

References

External links
 
 

1947 births
2005 deaths
Ghanaian footballers
Ghana international footballers
Olympic footballers of Ghana
Footballers at the 1972 Summer Olympics
Place of birth missing
Association football goalkeepers
Accra Hearts of Oak S.C. players